Marrowfat peas are green mature peas (Pisum sativum L. or Pisum sativum var. medullare) that have been allowed to dry out naturally in the field, rather than being harvested while still young like the normal garden pea. They are starchy, and are used to make mushy peas. Marrowfat peas with a good green colour are exported from the UK to Japan for the snack food market, while paler peas are used for canning. Those with thin skins and a soft texture are ideal for making mushy peas.

Its name 'marrowfat' was coined around 1730 from marrow and fat. Another source says the peas were named because people wanted plump (fat) peas of the Maro variety, a Japanese variety introduced to the UK in the early 20th century.

See also
Split peas, the skinned and halved dried pea

References

 

Legume dishes